Michael Vincent (born 1976) is a music journalist, publisher, and composer, situated in Toronto, Ontario.

Since 2014 he has been publisher and editor-in-chief of Ludwig Van (formally Musical Toronto), and CEO of Museland Media Inc. He was a freelance music critic for the Toronto Star, and also a composer of works which combine electronic and traditional instrumentation, as well as his work with spoken word, which includes a full-length opera Generation X with text by the Canadian Author Douglas Coupland.

Michael Vincent has written and edited for La Scena musicale, Norman Lebrecht and was a contributing author for the book, Playing With Words: the spoken word in artistic practice, a collection of responses from over 40 leading contemporary composers and artists who have been invited to represent aspects of their creative practice with words, and in particular, the spoken word, for the printed page.    Michael has studied with composers Osvaldo Golijov, Tim Brady, Gary Kulesha, Jean Claude Risset, Roberto Sierra, David MacIntyre, Barry Truax, Christos Hatzis, and James Rolfe. He has studied music at Victoria Conservatory of Music, McGill University, and holds advanced degrees from Concordia University (Montreal, Quebec), and Simon Fraser University (Vancouver, British Columbia).

Vincent graduated with a Doctorate in Musical Arts in composition and theory at the University of Toronto Faculty of Music and is a member of the Canadian Music Centre.

Bio 
In 2002, his piece Essence was recorded on the CEC labels DISContact! III compilation album.  Under direction of Tim Brady, Bradyworks ensemble premiered his Un-What? at Oscar Peterson Concert Hall. In March 2003, and Bozzini String Quartet premiered his Three Ring Circus in April 2004, and during that same year, Terra Firma was premiered by the Wire Ensemble under The New Modes group.

Between November 2003 and February 2004, Michael has premiered three electroacoustic works Sat There and Clapped, Advaita, and Three Stories for the Faint of Heart at the ÉuCue Concert Series at Oscar Peterson concert hall in Montreal, Quebec. In late 2003, he won the Allan award for his work in mixed electroacoustic and instrumental forms, and has written articles and reviews for eContact! Electroacoutic music journal, and la Scene Musicale classical music magazine. For the past 6 years, Michael has been on staff at la Scene Musicale, acting as new editor, and news contributor.

Michael has collaborated choreographer Jennifer Mascall and videographer Jacqueline Levitin on a feature work for the Off Centre Dance Company entitled Just Barely, which premiered at SFU Burnaby Theatre on April 8 and 9, 2005. Michael has also worked with plunderphnics composer, John Oswald on a concert inspired by Glenn Gould for the Vancouver New Forms festival, which saw the premiere of his work Gouldberg Variations on September 15, 2005. He has joined forces with the Vancouver spoken word artists Barbara Adler on two unique pieces entitled Baby 81 and Little Museum. Little Museum has since been recorded on the spoken word CD Flusterblush released in July 2006.

Over the years 2005 and 2006,  Michael wrote and adapted a feature-length spoken-word opera entitled Generation X- the Opera, which was based on a novel by Canadian author Douglas Coupland. Generation X- the Opera, premiered on March 17, 2006, at the SFU Burnaby Theatre, in Burnaby BC.

In February 2007, Michael premiered three speech melody compositions titled Warnings from Punk Rock 101, West-Coast Cats, and Dying Ain't Bad Y'all at  the Western Front in Vancouver BC, for the PuSh International Performing Arts Festival.

Michael also contributed as one of four composers in a multi-interdisciplinary work entitled Triaspora, performed at the Chan Centre for the Performing Arts on September 21–22, 2007 by Juno Award nominated performers Orchid Ensemble and Moving Dragon Dance, with multimedia by Aleksa Dulic and Kenneth Newby.

Most recently, the production was shown at the National Arts Centre (NAC) in Ottawa Canada as part of BC Scene

In the spring of 2010, Michael premiered a newly commissioned work (Tombeau for an Ancient Chinese General) for dance at the Royal Ontario Museum (ROM) as part of the International CanAsian Dance Festival, which was performed by Moving Dragon Dance and the TorQ Percussion Quartet.

Awards 
2011 Karen Kieser Prize in Canadian Music - Honourable Mention" - University of Toronto
2008-2012 Full-Tuition Fellowship" - University of Toronto
2010 Project Award" - Ontario Arts Council
2006 Graduating Project Grant" - Simon Fraser University
2006 Arts Service Award" - Simon Fraser University
2004 Graduate Fellowship" - Simon Fraser University
2003 Alain Award in Electroacoustic Composition" - Concordia University

Compositions

Film score 
"In the End" (2012, independent feature film)

Stage 
Koong (2010, 15'42")
Triaspora: Overture (2007, 9'30")
Generation X - The Opera (2006, 51')
Just Barely (2005, 11'11")

Orchestra 
Throwing a Line (2008, 12'00")

Chamber 
Quel Bon Hiver (2011, 10'36")
How They Come Singing (2011, 4'50")
What Times Is It There? (2010, 8'54")
Tombeau for an Ancient Warrior (2010, 15'42")
Jack (2008, 5'30")
Mothertongue (2008, 9'30")
West Coast Cats (2006, 9'37")
The Brevity of the Appellation (2005, 10'3")
Until You Are Satisfied (2005, 10'3")
Le Cirque de Calder (2004, 11'51")
Warnings from Punk Rock 101 (2003, 8'34")
Last of the Gallant Heroes (2003, 4'08")
Un-What (2003, 4'40")
Music to Rise to (2002, 3'36")
Four Set Mutations (2002, 15'20")

Solo 
A Mobile of Gulls (2011, 4'40")
Gawkey Music (2011, 7'46")
Max and the Life of Big Machines (2010–11, 16'18")
The Girl w/ X's for Eyes (2010, 4'40")
The Busy Life (2010, 6'06")
Haunting Lomax (2010, 10'06")
Flesh Colour (2008, 14'12")
The Filth and the Fury (2007, 7'11")
Dying Ain’t Bad Y’all (2006, 3'38")

Electroacoustic 
Little Museum (2006, 5'25")
Baby 81 (2005, 5'15")
Gouldberg Variations (2005, 11'11")
Terra Firma (2004, 15’)
Three Stories for the Faint of Heart (2004, 15 minutes)
Advaita (2003, 8'26")
Sat There and Clapped (featuring Kevin Austin)  (2003, 6'08")
Essence (2002, 2'50")

Interdisciplinary 
Sleepwalk (2005)

References

External links
Official website

1976 births
Artists from Victoria, British Columbia
Canadian classical composers
Canadian contemporary classical composers
Canadian male classical composers
Canadian music critics
Canadian sound artists
Living people
Musicians from Victoria, British Columbia